Emergency Nurse is a monthly professional magazine which covers research and clinical articles relevant to the practice of emergency nursing. It is published by RCNi.

See also 
 List of nursing journals

External links 
 

Monthly magazines published in the United Kingdom
Emergency nursing journals
Magazines with year of establishment missing
Professional and trade magazines
Royal College of Nursing publications